Koso, known in Japan as  is a Japanese fermented drink made by fermenting raw materials such as fruits and vegetables. The fermentation process produces enzymes, bacteria and microorganisms from the ingredients.
"Koso" means "enzyme" in Japanese, but Koso drink is also often referred to as Koso.

History 
Koso manufacture and selling began in Japan some 100 years ago. It was utilized as a nutritional supplement for hardworking and undernourished individuals at the time. It is now utilized in daily life for both nutritional and digestive assistance.

Manufacturing
Vegetables and fruits are mixed with sugar and fermented for several weeks or years by the enzymes contained in the ingredients and the power of yeast and lactic acid bacteria.

Effects
Koso is claimed to be good for gut flora because it is made using enzymes of bacteria and the action of the microorganisms themselves

There are three main reasons Kobo is known to be good for health. First, the nutrients of the drink are easily absorbed by the enzymes, and microorganisms decomposing it during the digestion process. Second, enzymes and microorganisms create vitamins and bioactive that were not present in the original food. And finally, it contains nutrients that feed on microbes that are beneficial to the human body and enterobacteria and prepare the intestinal environment.

A 2003 study conducted by Okayama Prefectural University found that microbial fermentation makes it easier for plant-derived components in enzyme drinks to be digested and absorbed as nutrients. 

A 2016 article in the Journal of Food and Drug Analysis found that fermented plant extract beverages such as Koso work well to combat hypercholesterolemia

In 2018 a study at Fukuoka Institute of Technology was conducted on enzyme drinks.

See also
 Dietary supplement
 Fermented food
 Kombucha

References 

Japanese drinks